Club de Fútbol Aurrerá was a football club from Mexico City that played in the Liga Mexicana de Futbol Amateur Association, the first organised league in that country.

History
Aurrerá was founded in 1919, by a group of Spanish (Basque and Asturian) immigrants.

In the 1920–21 season the tournament was split into two leagues, one being the Mexican league and the other being the National league. Aurrerá played in the National league with clubs América, Germania, España, L'Amicale Francaise, Reforma and Luz y Fuerza.

In the 1923–24 season the club joined "Liga Mexicana Amateur Association" and finished 4th. At the end of 1928–29 the club retired from the league, folding soon after.

Asturian diaspora
Defunct football clubs in Mexico City
Association football clubs established in 1919
1919 establishments in Mexico
1950 disestablishments in Mexico
Primera Fuerza teams
Basque diaspora in North America
Diaspora sports clubs
Spanish-Mexican culture